Jake Black may refer to:

 Jake Black (musician), member of the English electronic band Alabama 3
 Jake Black (snowboarder), American snowboarder in the 2015 Winter Universiade men's slopestyle

See also
 Jacob Black, fictional character in the Twilight novel series